The 1970 New Zealand Royal Visit Honours were appointments by Elizabeth II to the Royal Victorian Order, to mark her visit to New Zealand that year. The Queen was accompanied by the Prince of Wales (now Charles III) and Princess Anne on the tour, and attended celebrations connected with the bicentenary of Captain James Cook's first voyage to New Zealand. The honours were announced on 21 and 26 March 1970.

The recipients of honours are displayed here as they were styled before their new honour.

Royal Victorian Order

Knight Grand Cross (GCVO)
 Sir Arthur Espie Porritt  – governor-general of New Zealand

Commander (CVO)
 Patrick Jerad O'Dea  – of Lower Hutt
 Commissioner George Colin Urquhart  – of Wellington
 David Claverly Williams – of Wellington

Member, fourth class (MVO)
 Bryan David Crompton – of Days Bay
 Colonel Henry Noel Hoare – of Wellington
 Eric Mark Horan – of Lower Hutt
 Douglas Alexander Johnston  – of Wellington
 Peter John Hope Purvis  – of York Bay
 Squadron Leader Geoffrey Wallingford  – Royal New Zealand Air Force; of Wellington

In 1984, Members of the Royal Victorian Order, fourth class, were redesignated as Lieutenants of the Royal Victorian Order (LVO).

Member, fifth class (MVO)
 Chief Superintendent George Claridge – New Zealand Police; of Wellington
 Squadron Leader Daniel John Cotton  – Royal New Zealand Air Force; of Raumati Beach
 Desmond James Cummings – of Wellington
 Walter James Wynn Williams – of Upper Hutt
 Francis Eamonn Wilson – of Lower Hutt

Royal Victorian Medal

Bar to the Royal Victorian Medal (Silver) (RVM)
 Harold Eugene Symonds  – of Lower Hutt

Silver (RVM)
 Detective Senior Sergeant Bruce Fergus Scott – of Auckland

References

1970 awards
Royal Visit Honours
Monarchy in New Zealand